The UCR Citrus Variety Collection (CVC) is one of the most important collections of citrus diversity in the world. It is used for research, plant breeding, and educational extension activities on the UC Riverside campus in Riverside, California.

Holdings
The collection is composed of over 1000 accessions, planted as two trees of each of various types of citrus and citrus relatives. The collection largely comprises accessions within the genus Citrus, the remaining types are included among 28 other related genera in the Rutaceae subfamily Aurantioideae.

It includes accessions that were first introduced in the early 20th century, as well as varieties brought in over time from various curators, and newer varieties that were more recently developed by breeding or brought in as material through the Citrus Clonal Protection Program (CCPP), a special program that evaluates the trees for the nursery and citrus industries.

History

Services
The collection currently serves as a genetic resource for research and breeding.  Other research being conducted in the collection ranges from subjects related to entomology, nematology, microbiology, plant pathology, soil science, and metabolomics.  In addition, the USDA-ARS National Clonal Germplasm Repository for Citrus and Dates (NCGRCD) uses the collection for the conservation of genetic diversity within the family Rutaceae.

The collection is one of the most diverse citrus germplasm collections.  Aside from its foundations of supporting research, the collection also supports educational tours and extension activities through the University of California, Riverside.

David Karp photographed the fruit and trees of the CVC, which are placed on the web by Toni Siebert.

Curators 
 R. Smith (1909–1911) Superintendent of Whittier and Rubidoux Labs
 John Eliot Coit (1911–1912) Superintendent of Whittier and Rubidoux Labs
 Herbert John Webber (1912–1936) Director of Citrus Experiment Station
 Leon Dexter Batchelor (1936–1946) Director of Citrus Experiment Station
 Willard Paul Bitters (1946–1982) Professor of Horticulture
 Robert K. Soost (1982–1986) Professor of Genetics
 E.M. Nauer (1982–1989) Specialist
 M.L. Roose (1986–1995) Professor of Genetics
 R.W. Scora (1986–1995) Professor of Botany
 K.D. Bowman (1990–1992) Senior Museum Scientist
 Tracy L. Kahn (1995–current) Senior Museum Scientist

See also
 Citrus taxonomy
 Oroblanco

Notes

References
Citrus Variety Collection History
Article about rare citrus fruit like Yuzu, Sudachi and Kabosu

External links
 Citrus Variety Collection website
 Fruit Maven Website, impression of visit in the collection
 Los Angeles Times on the Collection, and tasting of the varieties

Citrus Variety Collection
Agricultural research institutes in the United States
Agriculture in Riverside County, California
Citrus production
Nature conservation in the United States
Research institutes in California